The XtremeAir Sbach 300 is a German aerobatic aircraft, designed by Philippe Steinbach and produced by XtremeAir, of Cochstedt. The aircraft is supplied as a complete ready-to-fly-aircraft.

The aircraft bears the company designation XA41, but is marketed under the name Sbach 300, although use of this name was later abandoned.

Design and development
The Sbach 300 is an all-composite design, predominantly constructed of carbon fibre. It features a cantilever low-wing, a single-seat enclosed cockpit under a bubble canopy, fixed conventional landing gear and a single engine in tractor configuration. The standard engine employed is the  Lycoming IO-580 four-stroke powerplant.

The 300 was later developed into a two-seat version, the XtremeAir Sbach 342, which was introduced in 2007.

Operational history
The Sbach 300 was flown to a German national aerobatic championship in the unlimited class. Seven XA41s were completed by XtremeAir by 2020, with an additional example completed from a kit. Another XA41, powered by a  Vedeneyev M14P was completed with the name Angry Fish.

Specifications (Sbach 300)

See also
List of aerobatic aircraft

References

External links

Single-engined tractor aircraft
Aerobatic aircraft
Low-wing aircraft
Aircraft first flown in 2006